Flag of Portland may refer to:
Flag of Portland, Oregon
Flag of Portland, Maine

See also
Portland (disambiguation)